Beazell Memorial Forest is a preserve of temperate rainforest  west of Corvallis, Oregon, United States in the Central Oregon Coast Range. The forest was donated to Benton County by Fred Beazell in 2000.

Geography 
It has a trail and a dirt road that form a loop around the forest together. The forest gets enough rain to almost be a temperate rainforest, as it's on a western slope.

It is the largest park maintained by Benton County.

See also

Benton County, Oregon
Corvallis, Oregon

References

External links 
Beazell Memorial Forest (official website)

Forests of Oregon
Parks in Benton County, Oregon
County parks in Oregon